Series 27 of University Challenge ran between 10 September 1997 and 21 April 1998. The winning team were Magdalen College, Oxford, who were the first team to successfully defend their title.

Results
 Winning teams are highlighted in bold.
 Teams with green scores (winners) returned in the next round, while those with red scores (losers) were eliminated.
 Teams with orange scores have lost, but survived as highest scoring losers.
 A score in italics indicates a match decided on a tie-breaker question.

First round

Second round

Quarter-finals

Semi-finals

Final

 The trophy and title were awarded to the Magdalen team comprising Paul O'Donnell, Phil Jones, Sarah Fitzpatrick and Alex de Jongh.
 The trophy was presented by Richard Dawkins.

References

External links
 University Challenge Homepage
 Blanchflower Results Table

1997
1997 British television seasons
1998 British television seasons